The name Bullers of Buchan refers both to a collapsed sea cave and to the adjacent village, situated about  south of Peterhead in Buchan, Aberdeenshire, Scotland.

The Bullers of Buchan Stone: Stone lifting enthusiasts can now enjoy the choice of lifting a 110kg or 58.6kg stone near the Bullers of Buchan.

Cave 

Village 
The small hamlet of cottages here is also known by the same name, and was historically a fishing village launching small boats from the bay below (the slipway may still be seen at low tide).

Cliffs 
The cliffs at the Bullers provide a nesting site in spring for colonies of seabirds, including kittiwakes, puffins, fulmars, shags, razorbills and guillemots along with herring gulls and great black-backed gulls. Eider ducks may also be seen here, and gannets are frequently seen passing en route to their colonies north at Troup Head and south at the Bass Rock. Grey seals may be seen in the bay, and dolphins are often seen passing by offshore.

Access
The area is a popular sightseeing spot, with a car park but no tourist facilities. Access is via the A975 road, which is served by a regular bus service between Peterhead and Aberdeen.

The Bullers of Buchan lie on the Buchan coastal footpath, leading south to Slains Castle, Cruden Bay and Whinnyfold, and north to the Longhaven wildlife reserve.

Name 

The name "Bullers" has been thought to be derived from the French "bouillir", meaning "to boil", as the water in the pot appears to boil during stormy weather, but another explanation says that the word is a Scots word meaning "rushing of water", relating to the sound made by the waves crashing in through the archway opening into the pot, perhaps.

History
The local area is rich with prehistory and historical features. Somewhat inland are a number of prehistoric monuments including Catto Long Barrow, Silver Cairn and numerous tumuli. In that same vicinity of the Laeca Burn watershed is the point d'appui of historic battles between invading Danes and indigenous Picts.

The Bullers of Buchan were cited in historical literature as early as the 18th century, most notably by the literary journalist James Boswell.

The Great North of Scotland Railway opened a halt at Bullers O'Buchan in 1900 to serve the needs of visitors to the site. The station closed in 1932.

See also
Catto Long Barrow
Laeca Burn

Line notes

References
 C. Michael Hogan (2008) Catto Long Barrow fieldnotes, The Modern Antiquarian
 James Boswell, Frederick Albert Pottle, Charles Hodges Bennett, Ralph Heyward Isham Boswell's Journal of a Tour to the Hebrides with Samuel Johnson, LL.D, republished by The Viking Press, 1936, 435 pages

External links

Bullers of Buchan homepage

Villages in Aberdeenshire
Sites of Special Scientific Interest in Banff and Buchan